Sainte-Marguerite is French for Saint Margaret and may refer to the following places:

Belgium

 Sint-Margriete, a section of Sint-Laureins in East Flanders province

Canada

 Sainte-Marguerite, Chaudière-Appalaches, Quebec, northeast of Montreal
 Sainte-Marguerite-du-Lac-Masson, Quebec, northwest of Montreal, an early alpine skiing destination
 Sainte-Marguerite-Marie, Bas-Saint-Laurent region, Quebec
 Zec de la Rivière-Sainte-Marguerite, "controlled harvesting zone", in Quebec

France

 Île Sainte-Marguerite, the largest of the Lérins Islands, off the coast of France, in Cannes 
 Sainte-Marguerite de Pornichet, a seaside resort, in the Loire-Atlantique département, in France 

Communes in France:
 Sainte-Marguerite, Haute-Loire, in the Haute-Loire département 
 Sainte-Marguerite, Vosges, in the Vosges département 

It is part of the name of several other French communes:
 Sainte-Marguerite-de-Carrouges, in the Orne département 
 Sainte-Marguerite-de-l'Autel, in the Eure département
 Sainte Marguerite d'Elle, in the Calvados département 
 Sainte Marguerite des Loges, in the Calvados département 
 Sainte Marguerite de Viette, in the Calvados département 
 Sainte-Marguerite-en-Ouche, in the Eure département 
 Sainte-Marguerite-Lafigère, in the Ardèche département 
 Sainte-Marguerite-sur-Duclair, in the Seine-Maritime département 
 Sainte-Marguerite-sur-Fauville, in the Seine-Maritime département 
 Sainte-Marguerite-sur-Mer, in the Seine-Maritime département

See also
 Saint Margaret (disambiguation)